Strada statale 4 Dir or SS 4 Dir or SS 4 Salaria Dir is a short Italian state highway, linking Strada statale 4 Via Salaria at Passo Corese to the A1 motorway at Fiano Romano.

It is a dual carriageway highway long only , made in 1964 and managed by ANAS. It is recognized as a road of national interest.

Route 
Strada statale 4 Dir was built to make more fluid traffic between the province of Rieti and Rome, taking advantage to the fact that, in that area, Via Salaria and the A1 motorway are very close but divided by Tiber river.

In fact, SS 4 Dir allows to travel from Passo Corese to Rome entirely on fast-flowings roads, linking Via Salaria to the A1 motorway northbound branch (A1 Dir) which is connected to Grande Raccordo Anulare and, from this, to Tangenziale Est of Rome. The alternative would be to use the Strada statale 4 Via Salaria that is a single carriage highway, extending travel times and clogging up traffic.

References 

004 dir
Fiano Romano